Nikola Krčmarević (Serbian Cyrillic: Никола Крчмаревић ; born 18 December 1991) is a Serbian professional footballer who plays as a midfielder for Greek Super League 2 club Karaiskakis.

Career

Kerala Blasters FC
Krčmarević represented Kerala Blasters in the 2018–19 Indian Super League season. He played their first 12 league matches 
and a cup match and has netted 2 goals.

References

External links

1991 births
Living people
Footballers from Belgrade
Serbian footballers
Serbia under-21 international footballers
FK Čukarički players
FK Smederevo players
FK Sinđelić Beograd players
FK Radnik Surdulica players
Serbian First League players
Serbian SuperLiga players
Association football midfielders
Panelefsiniakos F.C. players
Panegialios F.C. players
Indian Super League players
Kerala Blasters FC players